The 1993 Women's Cricket World Cup was an international cricket tournament played in England from 20 July to 1 August 1993. Hosted by England for the second time, it was the fifth edition of the Women's Cricket World Cup, and came over four years after the preceding 1988 World Cup in Australia.

The tournament was organised by the International Women's Cricket Council (IWCC), with matches played over 60 overs. It was "run on a shoestring", and was close to being cancelled until a £90,000 donation was received from the Foundation for Sport and the Arts. England won the tournament for a second time, defeating New Zealand in the final by 67 runs. A record eight teams participated, with Denmark, India, and the West Indies joining the five teams from the 1988 edition. Denmark and the West Indies were making their tournament debuts. England's Jan Brittin led the tournament in runs, while her captain Karen Smithies and New Zealand's Julie Harris led the tournament in wickets.

Squads

Venues

Warm-up matches
Eleven warm-up matches were played against various English teams, all before the beginning of the tournament.

Group stage

Points table

 Note: run rate was used as a tiebreaker in the case of teams finishing on an equal number of points, rather than net run rate (as is now common).

Matches

1st Match

Final
The final at Lord's was attended by 4,500 spectators, including the Prime Minister of the United Kingdom, John Major. The match was broadcast live on BBC's Grandstand, and England's victory received front-page and back-page coverage in all of the major national newspapers, a first for women's cricket. England's performance was often contrasted with that of the English men's side, which had lost the 1993 Ashes series to Australia less than a week earlier. The Women's Cricket Association (WCA) was praised for its management of the final, but the increased media coverage also led to some criticism of its role in the sport as a whole.

Statistics

Most runs
The top five runscorers are included in this table, ranked by runs scored, then by batting average, then alphabetically by surname.

Source: CricketArchive

Most wickets

The top five wicket takers are listed in this table, ranked by wickets taken and then by bowling average.

Source: CricketArchive

Notes

References

 
1993
1993 in women's cricket
1993 in English cricket
World Cup 1993
July 1993 sports events in the United Kingdom
August 1993 sports events in the United Kingdom